is a Japanese musician, singer, model, and actress. She is represented by the talent agency Amuse, Inc. She is a member of the kawaii metal group Babymetal and a former member of the idol group Sakura Gakuin.

Biography 
Moa Kikuchi was signed to the talent agency Amuse, Inc. at the age of 8, after winning Semi-Grand Prix (becoming a runner-up) in the Ciao Girl Audition 2007 held by the company.

On August 2, 2010, at the age of 11, Kikuchi joined Sakura Gakuin, an idol group also managed by Amuse, Inc. She joined at the same time as another future Babymetal member, Yui Mizuno. Sakura Gakuin had not yet released its debut single. During their audition, Kikuchi and Mizuno performed a duo dance cover of "Over The Future" by Karen Girl's; two members of that group, Ayami Mutō and Suzuka Nakamoto, had also recently joined Sakura Gakuin.

Besides performing as a whole group, Sakura Gakuin members were also divided into smaller subgroups known as "clubs”. Each club had its own musical group that recorded its own songs. Kikuchi and Mizuno first became members of the "Baton Club" and its musical group Twinklestars. As backing singers and dancers, they were later teamed with lead singer Suzuka Nakamoto in a "Heavy Music" club, with the associated music group being named Babymetal. Before the formation of this club, none of the three members knew what heavy metal was.

Babymetal became an independent recording group in 2013. Kikuchi "graduated" from Sakura Gakuin in 2015, and now performs with Babymetal exclusively. Kikuchi and Mizuno have a writing credit under the name "Black Babymetal" on the first Babymetal album in 2014, having written "Song 4" together during a bus trip. The second Babymetal album, Metal Resistance, was released in 2016. A third album, Metal Galaxy, followed in 2019.

Personal life 
Kikuchi is an idol otaku, which was notably mentioned as part of her introduction in the Sakura Gakuin song "Mezase! Super Lady". Her favorite group is °C-ute, and she is acquainted with her favorite former member of the group, Airi Suzuki. In interviews, she has also mentioned Bring Me the Horizon, Limp Bizkit, and Metallica as her favorite metal bands. In her spare time, Kikuchi also likes to watch anime and her favorite show is Love Live!, which is a series about idols.

Kikuchi is an only child. She has revealed that her mother was also approached by a talent agent as a student, but in the end never joined the entertainment industry.

Associated acts 
 Sakura Gakuin (August 4, 2010—March 29, 2015)
 Twinklestars (Sakura Gakuin sub-unit)
 Mini-Pati (Sakura Gakuin sub-unit)
 Babymetal (2010—present)
  Black Babymetal (Babymetal subunit)

Discography

With Sakura Gakuin 
Sakura Gakuin 2010 Nendo: Message (2011)
Sakura Gakuin 2011 Nendo: Friends (2012)
Sakura Gakuin 2012 Nendo: My Generation (2013)
Sakura Gakuin 2013 Nendo: Kizuna (2014)
Sakura Gakuin 2014 Nendo: Kimi ni Todoke (2015)

With Babymetal 
Babymetal (2014)
Metal Resistance (2016)
 Metal Galaxy (2019)
 The Other One (2023)

Notes

References

External links 
 Official profile at Amuse Inc.

Babymetal members
Sakura Gakuin members
1999 births
Living people
Japanese female idols
Japanese women heavy metal singers
21st-century Japanese women singers
People from Nagoya
Musicians from Aichi Prefecture
Kawaii metal musicians
Amuse Inc. talents